The 2016–17 Santosh Trophy was the 71st edition of the Santosh Trophy, the main state competition for football in India.

Services are the reigning champions. Teams such as Gujarat, Tamil Nadu, and Kerala have begun preparations for the tournament.

Qualified teams

The following 10 teams have qualified for the Santosh Trophy proper.

 Chandigarh 
 Punjab
 Kerala
 Services
 Mizoram
 Maharashtra
 Railways
 Goa
 Meghalaya
 West Bengal

Group stage

Group A

Fixtures and Results

Group B

Fixtures and Results

Knockout stage

Semi-finals

Final

References

 
Santosh Trophy seasons